The 1991 Major League Baseball season saw the Minnesota Twins defeat the Atlanta Braves for the World Series title, in a series where every game was won by the home team.

Awards and honors
Baseball Hall of Fame
Rod Carew
Ferguson Jenkins
Tony Lazzeri
Gaylord Perry
Bill Veeck

Other awards
Outstanding Designated Hitter Award: Chili Davis (MIN)
Roberto Clemente Award (Humanitarian):  Harold Reynolds (SEA).
Rolaids Relief Man Award: Bryan Harvey (CAL, American); Lee Smith (STL, National).

Player of the Month

Pitcher of the Month

Statistical leaders

Standings

American League

National League

Postseason

Bracket

Managers

American League

National League

Home Field Attendance & Payroll

Television coverage

Events

January–March
January 6 – Alan Wiggins, former leadoff hitter for the San Diego Padres and a key member of their 1984 pennant run, becomes the first baseball player known to die of AIDS. He was 32.
January 7 – Pete Rose is released from Marion Federal Prison after serving a five-month sentence for tax evasion.
January 8 – Rod Carew, Gaylord Perry and Ferguson Jenkins are elected to the Hall of Fame by the Baseball Writers' Association of America, with Carew becoming the 22nd player to be named in his first year of eligibility.
February 4 – The 12 members of the board of directors of the Hall of Fame vote unanimously to bar Pete Rose from the ballot.
February 26 – New York Yankees second baseman Tony Lazzeri and major league owner Bill Veeck are elected to the Hall of Fame by the Veterans Committee.

April–June
April – MLB requires that all teams wear American and Canadian flag decals on their batting helmets in honor of those who served in Operation Desert Storm.
April 8 – Just hours before the first pitch of the baseball season, MLB averts an umpires strike by reaching agreement with the Major League Umpires' Association on a new four-year contract.
April 18 – The new Comiskey Park opens across the street from where the original stood in Chicago. A sold-out stadium sees the Detroit Tigers defeat the Chicago White Sox, 16–0.
April 21 – The Chicago Cubs score five runs in the top of the eleventh inning, but the Pittsburgh Pirates comeback with six runs in the bottom of the inning for the victory;  the greatest extra-innings comeback (in terms of runs) in Major League history.
April 23 – Nick Leyva is fired as manager of the Philadelphia Phillies, becoming the first manager fired in 1991.
May 1 – Nolan Ryan of the Texas Rangers records his seventh no-hitter, striking out Roberto Alomar for the final out in a 3–0 victory over the Toronto Blue Jays.
May 1 – Rickey Henderson of the Oakland Athletics records his 939th stolen base, eclipsing Lou Brock's all-time record.
May 21 – Don Zimmer is fired as manager of the Chicago Cubs and replaced by Jim Essian. Zimmer is the second manager fired during the 1991 season.
May 22 – John Wathan is fired as manager of the Kansas City Royals and replaced by Hal McRae. Wathan is the third manager fired in less than one month.
May 23 – By stealing second base from pitcher Ron Darling and catcher Rick Cerone of the New York Mets, Andre Dawson of the Chicago Cubs becomes the third player in baseball history to record 300 home runs and 300 stolen bases. As of this date, the only other members of the 300–300 club are Bobby Bonds and Willie Mays. On the same day, Philadelphia Phillies pitcher Tommy Greene throws a no-hitter, and the Baltimore Orioles fire Frank Robinson and replace him with Johnny Oates. Robinson is the fourth manager fired on the season, and the third fired in three days.
June 3 – Buck Rodgers becomes the fifth managerial casualty of the season, and the third in the National League East. Tom Runnels replaces Rodgers as the new Montreal Expos manager.
June 10 – The National League votes to choose Miami, Florida, and Denver, Colorado, to form baseball teams for the 1993 season. They beat out Orlando, Florida, St. Petersburg, Florida, Washington, D.C. and Buffalo, New York. The Miami franchise was awarded to Blockbuster Video CEO H. Wayne Huizenga, while the Denver franchise was awarded to Ohio beverage distributor John Antonucci and Phar-Mor CEO Michael I. Monus.
June 16 – The Cincinnati Reds and Philadelphia Phillies wear 1957 uniforms in a Nostalgia Day game at Veterans Stadium.

July–September
July 6 – The National League publicly announces its two expansion franchises for 1993: the Colorado Rockies and the Florida Marlins.
July 6 – John McNamara, winner of the 1979 National League West division with the Cincinnati Reds and 1986 American League pennant with the Boston Red Sox, is fired as manager of the Cleveland Indians. He is replaced by Mike Hargrove. The firing is the sixth on the season and occurs just as the first half of the season ends.
July 7 – Outside a restaurant in Arlington, Texas, American League umpire Steve Palermo is shot and paralyzed from the waist down after aiding a woman who was being mugged. The assailant is later sentenced to 75 years in prison.
July 9 – Cal Ripken Jr.'s three-run home run lifts the American League to a 4–2 win over the National League in the annual All-Star Game, held at the SkyDome in Toronto. Andre Dawson homers for the NL, who lose for the fourth straight year. Ripken Jr., who also won the pre-game Home Run Derby, is named the game's MVP.
July 13 – The Baltimore Orioles throw the second four-man no-hitter in baseball history, as Bob Milacki, Mike Flanagan, Mark Williamson, and Gregg Olson combine for a 2–0 win against the Oakland Athletics. On September 28, 1975, four Oakland Athletics pitchers (Vida Blue, Glenn Abbott, Paul Lindblad, and Rollie Fingers) tossed a combined no-hitter against the California Angels.
July 26 – Montreal Expos pitcher Mark Gardner throws a no-hitter through nine innings, but does not complete it when his team fails to score against Los Angeles Dodgers starter Orel Hershiser and reliever Kip Gross. Gardner loses the no-hitter and the game in the tenth inning when the Dodgers get three hits and score the only run of the game. The Expos only get two hits.
July 28 – Picking up where Mark Gardner left off, Montreal Expos hurler Dennis Martínez throws a perfect game against the Los Angeles Dodgers. The Expos only get four hits, but they score two runs and give Martínez the thirteenth perfect game in major league history. Ron Hassey, Martínez's catcher, becomes the first player to catch two perfect games, having also caught Len Barker's in 1981.
July 31 – Two-sport star Deion Sanders of the Atlanta Braves, playing in his final game of the season with the Braves before having to report to the Atlanta Falcons' training camp, hits a three-run homer to spark a come-from-behind 8-6 win over the Pittsburgh Pirates.
August 11 – In only his second Major League game, and first Major League start, Wilson Álvarez throws a no-hitter as the Chicago White Sox beat the Baltimore Orioles, 7–0. It is the fifth no-hitter of the 1991 season, not including Mark Gardner's nine inning no-hitter that was lost in the tenth on July 26.
August 14 – California Angels DH Dave Winfield hits his 400th career home run against the Minnesota Twins. Winfield is the 23rd player in major league history to accomplish the feat.
August 26 – The sixth no-hitter of 1991 is thrown by two-time Cy Young Award winner Bret Saberhagen. The Kansas City Royals pitcher no-hits the Chicago White Sox, 7–0, for his first career no-hitter. On the same day, the seventh managerial firing of 1991 occurs as the California Angels, who have gone from first to last in less than one month, fire Doug Rader and replace him with the recently deposed Buck Rodgers.
September 4 – Removing an "asterisk" which was never universally recognized, the Statistical Accuracy Committee decides to put Roger Maris' 61 home run season of 1961 ahead of Babe Ruth's 60 mark of 1927. Regarding the expunging of the asterisk, historian Bill Deane later points out, "It was an easy job: the asterisk never existed. Maris' record was, from 1962 until 1991, listed separately from Ruth's and was never actually defined by 'some distinctive mark.'" The eight-man panel also re-defines a no-hit game as one which ends after nine or more innings with one team failing to get a hit, thereby removing 50 games from the list that had previously been considered hitless, including the 1959 performance of St. Louis Cardinals' Harvey Haddix, who pitched 12 perfect innings against the Milwaukee Braves, and Cincinnati Reds' Jim Maloney 1965 1–0 loss to the New York Mets in 11 innings. Another casualty is Boston Red Sox reliever Ernie Shore 27 straight outs on June 23, 1917, a game in which he relieved Babe Ruth after being ejected for protesting a walk to Ray Morgan, the first Washington Senators batter he faced. Morgan was thrown out trying to steal second, and Shore retired all 26 men he faces in a 4–0 win‚ getting credit in the books for a perfect game.
 September 11 – The Atlanta Braves, on the verge of a pennant, throw a three-man no-hitter at Atlanta–Fulton County Stadium against the San Diego Padres. Kent Mercker, Mark Wohlers, and Alejandro Peña combine to no-hit the San Diego Padres, the seventh no-hitter of 1991. Controversy ensues when Tony Gwynn apparently ends the no-hitter with two outs in the ninth inning but the official scorer rules it an error on Terry Pendleton.
 September 13 – A piece of concrete weighing several tons falls in Montréal's Olympic Stadium.  It forces the Montréal Expos to play the remainder of their home games on the road.
 September 14 – Cecil Fielder of the Detroit Tigers hits what will be the only home run to ever exit Milwaukee County Stadium during either the Braves' Milwaukee history (–) or Brewers' park history (–). The blast comes off Brewer pitcher Dan Plesac in the fourth inning of a 6–4 Tiger victory.
September 15 – Smokey Burgess, a former major leaguer and previous holder of the record for most pinch-hits, dies at age 64.
September 16 – Otis Nixon, the league's leading base stealer and catalyst on the Atlanta Braves' run from last to first, fails a drug test and is suspended for sixty days, consisting of the rest of the 1991 baseball season and the first six weeks of the 1992 season. The Braves lose the first two games without Nixon but rebound to win the National League pennant.
September 22 – The Pittsburgh Pirates become the first National League East team since the 1976-77-78 Philadelphia Phillies to win consecutive division titles when they beat their in-state rival Phillies, 2–1.
September 29 – The Minnesota Twins become the first team to ever go from last place to first over the course of one season when a Chicago White Sox loss to the Seattle Mariners clinches the American League West title. It is the Twins' first division crown since 1987. The New York Mets fire manager Bud Harrelson on the same day, the eighth managerial firing of the year.

October–December
October 2 – Atlanta Braves pitcher Tom Glavine becomes the first 20-game winner in the majors by beating the Cincinnati Reds. The win assures Glavine of the Cy Young Award when it is given in November.
October 2 – The Toronto Blue Jays capture their third American League East title since 1985 by beating the California Angels 6–5 on a walk-off RBI single by Joe Carter. The same day, the Blue Jays become the first team to ever play before more than four million fans in a single season.
October 3 – Chicago White Sox catcher Carlton Fisk hits two home runs, including a grand slam, to lead the White Sox to a 13–12 victory over the Minnesota Twins. In doing so, just nine months shy of his 44th birthday, Fisk becomes the oldest 20th-century player to collect a two-HR game. His 7th-inning grand slam off Steve Bedrosian also makes him the oldest major leaguer ever to hit a bases-loaded homer. Cap Anson, at 45, hit two home runs on this date in 1897, and is the oldest major league player to hit a pair.
October 4 - The Seattle Mariners won their 82nd game over the Chicago White Sox, to post their first winning season.
October 5 – The Atlanta Braves become the second team in two weeks to go from last to first when they beat the Houston Astros, 5–2. Moments later, the San Francisco Giants eliminate their arch-rivals, the Los Angeles Dodgers, when Trevor Wilson pitches a 4–0 complete game shutout, handing the National League West division title to the Braves. John Smoltz gets his fourteenth win of the season as the Braves close out with eight consecutive wins after trailing the Dodgers by two with only ten games left to play.
October 6 – New York Mets pitcher David Cone ties a National League record by striking out 19 Philadelphia Phillies in a 7–0 Mets win over their rivals.
October 7 – Leo Durocher, who is credited with the phrase 'nice guys finish last,' dies at the age of 86. The same day, the New York Yankees fire Stump Merrill, the ninth major league manager fired in 1991.
October 8 – Despite finishing in second, their lowest finish in his 3½ years as manager, the Boston Red Sox dismiss Joe Morgan and replace him with Butch Hobson. Morgan is the tenth manager fired in 1991.
October 9 – Tom Trebelhorn becomes the eleventh managerial casualty of 1991 despite a record of 40–19 and a finish over .500 with the Milwaukee Brewers.
October 10 – Despite the large number of firings, the New York Mets hire Jeff Torborg as their new manager, replacing Bud Harrelson. On the same day, however, the Seattle Mariners fire Jim Lefebvre, the twelfth firing of 1991.
October 18 – Jim Essian, who replaced Don Zimmer in May, is fired as manager of the Chicago Cubs, the thirteenth and last firing of a manager in 1991. The thirteen firings in a season set a majors record that still stands.
October 27 – The Minnesota Twins become the World Series Champions with a 1–0 victory behind Jack Morris' masterful 10-inning shutout. Gene Larkin's single off Atlanta Braves reliever Alejandro Peña scores Dan Gladden with the game's only run. The game is the first Game Seven to go into extra innings since the 1924 World Series between the Washington Senators and New York Giants. Morris is named the Series MVP for the Twins, who win all four games at home while losing all three in Atlanta. Four of the seven games are decided on the final pitch, while five are decided by a single run, and three in extra innings. All are Series records.
November 18 – Bobby Bonilla leaves the Pittsburgh Pirates for the New York Mets and becomes the first five-million dollar a year player in major league baseball history.
November 25 – The Montreal Expos trade first baseman Andrés Galarraga to the St. Louis Cardinals for starting pitcher Ken Hill. Galarraga will struggle for St. Louis before enjoying a career renaissance with the Colorado Rockies in 1993.

References

External links
1991 Major League Baseball season schedule at Baseball Reference

 
Major League Baseball seasons